Business Deal Entertainment is a music collective in Austin, Texas that grew from the 1988 collaborations of Smokey Farris and Dirk Michener and their respective circles of friends in Cypress and Denton, Texas. The majority of current Business Deal members spawned from the side projects and numerous side-side projects of those early efforts.

List of artists (past and present)   
Cavedweller 
Charles Potts' Magic Windmill Band 
Count Dracula's Weed Smugglin Jam Engine
Maya Bond
The Carrots
Fishboy
Gene Defcon 
Hard Rock Zombie
La Junta High School 
The Old-Timerz
Teenage Dog
The Telephone Company
T.W.Bond
The Wyndyms
Zom Zoms
American Traditions
Attack Dog
Beachbirds
EZ Snaps
The Fantas Trees
Fart Face
From One American To Another 
The Julie Parker Love Spawn
Lil' Oh Jay
Oh-Jay! and the Brantis Oranguatangs
The Partridges and Pears
The Pinecones 
Prima Donnas 
Soup or Group 1 and 2 (maybe 3)
Uncanny Lunkheads
Video Scream

See also
 List of record labels

External links
Official website

Record labels based in Texas